Raipur City railway station was a  railway station in Raipur district, Chhattisgarh. Its code is RCT. It served Raipur city. The station consisted of one narrow-gauge platform. The station lied on the Raipur–Dhamtari branch line of Bilaspur–Nagpur section.

References

Railway stations in Raipur district
Raipur railway division